Piri Reza (also Romanized as Pīrī Reẕā; also known as Pīrī Sūkhteh-ye Zār) is a village in Kashkan Rural District, Shahivand District, Dowreh County, Lorestan Province, Iran. At the 2006 census, its population was 100, in 21 families.

References 

Towns and villages in Dowreh County